Aleksandr Vladimirovich Konovalov (in , born 9 June 1968) is a Russian lawyer and politician. From May 2008 to January 2020, he served as Minister of Justice.

Early life and education
Konovalov was born 9 June 1968 in Leningrad. In 1992, he graduated from the law department of Saint Petersburg State University.

Career
From 1992 to 2005 Konovalov served in Saint Petersburg prosecutor's office.

From February to November 2005 he was the chief prosecutor of Bashkortostan.

Between 14 November 2005 and May 2008, he had been President Vladimir Putin's plenipotentiary envoy to the Volga Federal District. In May 2008 he was appointed the minister of justice.

On 15 January 2020, he resigned as part of the cabinet, after President Vladimir Putin delivered the Presidential Address to the Federal Assembly, in which he proposed several amendments to the constitution.

References and notes

1968 births
1st class Active State Councillors of the Russian Federation
Justice ministers of Russia
Living people
Saint Petersburg State University alumni
21st-century Russian politicians
Saint Tikhon's Orthodox University alumni